Gymnastics events have been staged at the Olympic Games since 1896, with women competing for the time at the 1928 Olympic Games.  Japanese female artistic gymnasts first competed at the 1956 Olympic Games.

Gymnasts

Medalists

See also 
 Japan women's national gymnastics team

References

Japan
gymnasts
Olympic